This article contains a list of named passenger trains in the United States, with names beginning A through B.

A

B

Notes

References 
 
 
 
 
 

North America (A-B)
 A-B)
Named passenger trains